Ferenc Horváth (born 6 May 1973) is a Hungarian former professional footballer who played as a striker. He is now a manager, most recently coaching at Budapest Honvéd FC.

He made his debut for the Hungary national team in 1996, and got 32 caps and 11 goals until 2001.

Career statistics
Scores and results list Hungary's goal tally first, score column indicates score after each Horváth goal.

Honours

As a player
Genk
 Belgian League: 1999
 Belgian Cup: 2000
 Belgian Supercup: runners-up: 1999, 2000

Maccabi Tel Aviv
 Israeli Cup: 2002

Estoril
 Portuguese Second Division: 2004

FC Fehérvár
 Hungarian Cup: 2006
 Liga Cup: 2007

References

External links
 

1973 births
Living people
Hungarian footballers
Footballers from Budapest
Association football forwards
Hungary international footballers
Nemzeti Bajnokság I players
Scottish Premier League players
Belgian Pro League players
Bundesliga players
Liga Portugal 2 players
Israeli Premier League players
UD Almería players
G.D. Estoril Praia players
FC Energie Cottbus players
Maccabi Tel Aviv F.C. players
Livingston F.C. players
Újpest FC players
K.R.C. Genk players
Ferencvárosi TC footballers
Fehérvár FC players
SC Ostbahn XI players
Hungarian football managers
Kecskeméti TE managers
Paksi FC managers
Győri ETO FC managers
Szigetszentmiklósi TK managers
Fehérvár FC managers
Diósgyőri VTK managers
Szombathelyi Haladás football managers
Budapest Honvéd FC managers
Balmazújvárosi FC managers
Nemzeti Bajnokság I managers
Hungarian expatriate footballers
Hungarian expatriate sportspeople in Belgium
Expatriate footballers in Belgium
Hungarian expatriate sportspeople in Germany
Expatriate footballers in Germany
Hungarian expatriate sportspeople in Israel
Expatriate footballers in Israel
Hungarian expatriate sportspeople in Spain
Expatriate footballers in Spain
Hungarian expatriate sportspeople in Portugal
Expatriate footballers in Portugal
Hungarian expatriate sportspeople in Scotland
Expatriate footballers in Scotland